Raul Fernandez  may refer to:

 Raúl Fernández (basketball) (1905–1982), Mexican basketball player
 Raul Fernandez (entrepreneur) (born 1967), American entrepreneur
 Raul Fernández Arrizabalaga (born 1972), Spanish Paralympic judoka and cyclist
 Raül Refree (born 1976), Spanish musician born Raül Fernandez Miró
 Raúl Fernández (long jumper) (born 1978), Spanish long jumper
 Raúl Fernández (footballer, born 1985), Peruvian footballer
 Raúl Fernández (footballer, born 1988), Spanish footballer
 Raúl Fernández (motorcyclist) (born 2000), Spanish motorcycle racer

See also
 Raul Fernandex (Beyblade), fictional character from the anime and manga series Beyblade